is one of the largest personal computer and consumer electronics retailers in Japan. In 2000, it was the second largest e-commerce company in the country. Bic Camera acquired a majority stake in Sofmap in 2006, and turned it into a wholly owned subsidiary in January 2010. Formerly listed on the Tokyo Stock Exchange under the code 2690, Sofmap was delisted on 26 January 2010 after the transaction was completed.

As of 2018, Sofmap has 21 stores in 16 districts, mainly in Tokyo and Akihabara.

History
In 1984, Sofmap expanded its business to new and used PC hardware, as well as Nintendo Family Computer and PC software sales. A year later, the software rental business was discontinued after it was declared illegal by the Japanese government.

At the beginning of their hardware sales, Sofmap specialized in "box sales", where it set up shops at small-sized commercial buildings in Akihabara and Osaka/Nipponbashi and sold computers at low prices. In 1986, the company published a free publication titled , which listed computer products and prices. To differentiate themselves from other PC stores, Sofmap introduced their warranty system: five years for new computers and three years for used computers.

In anticipation of the PC boom that started with the release of Windows 95, Sofmap increased its floor space and focused on display sales for new PC users. However, during the mid-1990s, sales declined due to a combination of factors such as falling prices of personal computers, reduced distribution and profitability due to shortened product cycles of used products, and sluggish sales of home video games. In 1997, amidst rumors of the company filing for bankruptcy, Sofmap was purchased by Marubeni.

The sofmap.com website was also established that year.

In 2005, Marubeni partially transferred its shares of Sofmap to Bic Camera, with Bic owning 61.56% of Sofmap by 2006. On January 29, 2010, Sofmap became a wholly owned subsidiary of Bic Camera. On March 1, 2012, the retail division was split and Sofmap Co., Ltd. was established, and the remaining store real estate management division was merged into Bic Camera.

On October 31, 2019, Sofmap acquired anime shop  from Bunkyodo Group Holdings.

References

External links

 (Corporate) 
 

Japanese brands
1982 establishments in Japan
Companies formerly listed on the Tokyo Stock Exchange
Consumer electronics retailers of Japan
Retail companies based in Tokyo
Retail companies established in 1982
Video game retailers